Allah Darreh-ye Olya (also Romanized as Allāh Darreh-ye ‘Olyā; also known as Ālah Darreh-ye Balā, Āleh Darreh Bālā, Allāh Darreh-ye Bālā, Hala Darreh, Ḩaleh Darreh, and Hāleh Darreh-ye Olyā) is a village in Kowleh Rural District, Saral District, Divandarreh County, Kurdistan Province, Iran. At the 2006 census, its population was 344, in 69 families. The village is populated by Kurds.

References 

Towns and villages in Divandarreh County
Kurdish settlements in Kurdistan Province